Momodou Bojang (born 19 June 2001) is a Gambian professional footballer who plays for Rainbow as a striker.

Career
Bojang began his career with Rainbow and spent time on loan at Portuguese club Famalicão (playing for their under-23 team), before signing on loan for Scottish club Hibernian in June 2022. In December 2022, Hibs exercised an option to end the loan earlier than planned.

He has played for Gambia at under-20 youth level.

References

2001 births
Living people
Gambian footballers
F.C. Famalicão players
Hibernian F.C. players
Scottish Professional Football League players
Association football forwards
Gambian expatriate footballers
Gambian expatriate sportspeople in Portugal
Expatriate footballers in Portugal
Gambian expatriates in Scotland
Expatriate footballers in Scotland